Émilie Bonnivard (born 2 August 1980) is a French politician who has represented the 3rd constituency of the Savoie department in the National Assembly since 2017. A member of The Republicans (LR), she has also been a member of the Regional Council of Auvergne-Rhône-Alpes since 2016.

A native of Chambéry, Bonnivard served as Deputy Mayor of Montaimont from 2014 to 2017. She held one of the vice presidencies of the Regional Council of Auvergne-Rhône-Alpes from 2016 until 2017 under the presidency of Laurent Wauquiez, where she was tasked with agriculture and rurality.

Ahead of the 2022 presidential election, Bonnivard publicly declared her support for Michel Barnier as The Republicans' candidate.

References

External links 
 Biography at the French National Assembly

1980 births
Living people
Politicians from Chambéry
21st-century French women politicians
Women members of the National Assembly (France)
Deputies of the 15th National Assembly of the French Fifth Republic
Deputies of the 16th National Assembly of the French Fifth Republic
Politicians from Auvergne-Rhône-Alpes
Union for a Popular Movement politicians
The Republicans (France) politicians
Université Savoie-Mont Blanc alumni
Paris Nanterre University alumni
Regional councillors of Auvergne-Rhône-Alpes
Members of Parliament for Savoie